Martin Henry Balsam (November 4, 1919 – February 13, 1996) was an American actor. He had a prolific career in character roles in film, in theatre, and on television. An early member of the Actors Studio, he began his career on the New York stage, winning a Tony Award for Best Actor in a Play for Robert Anderson’s You Know I Can't Hear You When the Water's Running (1968). He won the Academy Award for Best Supporting Actor for his performance in A Thousand Clowns (1965).

His other notable film roles include Juror #1 in 12 Angry Men (1957), private detective Milton Arbogast in Psycho (1960), Hollywood agent O.J. Berman in Breakfast at Tiffany's (1961), Bernard B. Norman in The Carpetbaggers (1964), Lt. Commander Chester Potter, the ship doctor, in The Bedford Incident, Colonel Cathcart in Catch-22 (1970), Admiral Husband E. Kimmel in Tora! Tora! Tora! (1970), Mr. Green in The Taking of Pelham One Two Three (1974), Signor Bianchi in Murder on the Orient Express (1974), and Howard Simons in All the President's Men (1976). He had a recurring role as Dr. Milton Orloff on the television drama Dr. Kildare (1963–66), and Murray Klein on the sitcom Archie Bunker's Place (1979–83).

In addition to his Oscar and Tony Awards, Balsam was also a BAFTA Award, Golden Globe Award, and Emmy Award nominee. With Joyce Van Patten, he was the father of actress Talia Balsam.

Early life and education
Martin Henry Balsam was born November 4, 1919, in the Bronx borough of New York City, to Russian Jewish parents, Lillian (née Weinstein) and Albert Balsam, who was a manufacturer of women's sportswear. He attended DeWitt Clinton High School, where he participated in the drama club. He studied at the Dramatic Workshop of The New School in New York with the German director Erwin Piscator and then served in the United States Army Air Forces from 1941 to 1945 during World War II, achieving the rank of Sergeant. He served as a sergeant radio operator in a B-24 in the China-Burma-India Theater of Operations.

Career

Theatre 
Balsam made his professional debut in August 1941 in a production of The Play's the Thing in Locust Valley. After World War II, he resumed his acting career in New York.

In 1947-1949, Balsam was a resident member of the summer stock company Town Hall Players in West Newbury, Massachusetts, a community-sponsored summer theatre. In early 1948, he was selected by Elia Kazan to be a member in the recently formed Actors Studio. He appeared consistently in Broadway and off-Broadway plays, something he would continue to do well into his screen acting career. Columnist Earl Wilson dubbed him "The Bronx Barrymore".

In 1968, he won a Tony Award for Best Actor in a Play for his performance in the 1967 Broadway production of You Know I Can't Hear You When the Water's Running.

Television 
Balsam performed in several episodes of the studio's dramatic television anthology series, broadcast between September 1948 and 1950. He appeared in many other television drama series, including Decoy with Beverly Garland, The Twilight Zone (episodes "The Sixteen Millimeter Shrine" and "The New Exhibit"), as a psychologist in the pilot episode, Five Fingers, Target: The Corruptors!, The Eleventh Hour, Breaking Point, Alfred Hitchcock Presents, The Fugitive, and Mr. Broadway, as a retired U.N.C.L.E. agent in The Man from U.N.C.L.E. episode, "The Odd Man Affair", and guest-starred in the two-part Murder, She Wrote episode, "Death Stalks the Big Top". He also appeared in the Route 66 episode, "Somehow It Gets To Be Tomorrow".

He played Dr. Rudy Wells when the Martin Caidin novel Cyborg was adapted as a TV-movie pilot for The Six Million Dollar Man (1973), though he did not reprise the role for the subsequent series. In 1975, he appeared as James Arthur Cummins in the Joe Don Baker police drama Mitchell, a film that was eventually featured in a highly popular episode of the comedy film-riffing series Mystery Science Theater 3000 in 1993. He appeared as a spokesman/hostage in the TV movie Raid on Entebbe (1976) and as a detective in the TVM Contract on Cherry Street (1977), starring Frank Sinatra. He also appeared on an episode of Quincy, M.E.. Balsam starred as Murray Klein on the All in the Family spin-off Archie Bunker's Place for two seasons (1979–81) and returned for a guest appearance in the show's fourth and final season.

Film 
Balsam made his film debut with an uncredited role in On the Waterfront (1954), directed by his Actors' Studio colleague Elia Kazan. Balsam played an official of the Port Authority of New York and New Jersey investigating mob involvement in the city's waterfront unions. His breakthrough role came a few years later, when he played Juror #1 in 12 Angry Men (1957). He would collaborate with the film's director, Sidney Lumet, twice more with The Anderson Tapes (1971) and Murder on the Orient Express (1974).

In 1960, he appeared in one of his best-remembered roles as private investigator Arbogast in Alfred Hitchcock's Psycho. Along with Gregory Peck and Robert Mitchum, Balsam appeared in both the original Cape Fear (1962), and the 1991 Martin Scorsese remake. He won an Academy Award for Best Supporting Actor for his role as Arnold Burns in A Thousand Clowns (1965). Balsam also performed the original voice of the HAL 9000 computer in 2001: A Space Odyssey. After his lines were recorded, director Stanley Kubrick decided "Marty just sounded a little bit too colloquially American," and hired Douglas Rain to perform the role for the released film.

Balsam also appeared in such notable films as Time Limit with Richard Widmark, Breakfast at Tiffany's with Audrey Hepburn and George Peppard, The Carpetbaggers with George Peppard and Alan Ladd, Seven Days in May with Burt Lancaster and Kirk Douglas, The Bedford Incident with Richard Widmark and Sidney Portier, Hombre with Paul Newman and Fredric March, Catch-22 with Alan Arkin and Jon Voight, Tora! Tora! Tora! (as Admiral Husband E. Kimmel), Little Big Man with Dustin Hoffman, The Taking of Pelham One Two Three with Walter Matthau and Robert Shaw, All the President's Men with Dustin Hoffman and Robert Redford, The Delta Force with Lee Marvin, and The Goodbye People. One of his final acting appearances was in the 1994 horror parody The Silence of the Hams, which paid homage to his iconic role in Psycho.

Beyond Hollywood, Balsam was also a popular character actor in Italian films, beginning in 1960 when he starred in the Luigi Comencini film Everybody Go Home. He would star in several poliziottesco films throughout the 1970s, directed by the likes of Fernando Di Leo and Enzo G. Castellari. Balsam's roles in these films would be re-dubbed into Italian, but he would loop his own lines in the English-language export versions. Balsam maintained close ties to Italy even after the end of the poliziottesco trend, traveling there for both professional and personal reasons, and starring in the Italian-produced television series Ocean and La piovra.

Personal life 
In 1951, Balsam married his first wife, actress Pearl Somner. They divorced three years later. His second wife was actress Joyce Van Patten. This marriage lasted for four years (from 1958 until 1962) with one daughter, Talia Balsam. He married his third wife, Irene Miller, in 1963. They had two children, Adam and Zoe Balsam, and divorced in 1987.

Death 
On February 13, 1996, Balsam died of a stroke in his hotel room while vacationing in Rome, Italy. He was 76 years old. He is interred at Cedar Park Cemetery, in Emerson, New Jersey.

Filmography

Awards and nominations

Academy Awards

Tony Awards

BAFTA Awards

Golden Globe Awards

Primetime Emmy Awards

National Board of Review Awards

Drama Desk Awards

Obie Award

Outer Critics Circle Awards

References

External links 

 
 
  
 
 
 

1919 births
1996 deaths
American male film actors
United States Army Air Forces personnel of World War II
American expatriates in Italy
American male stage actors
American male television actors
American people of Russian-Jewish descent
Best Supporting Actor Academy Award winners
DeWitt Clinton High School alumni
Jewish American male actors
Male actors from New York City
Tony Award winners
Jewish American military personnel
United States Army Air Forces soldiers
20th-century American male actors
People from the Bronx
The New School alumni
Burials at Cedar Park Cemetery (Emerson, New Jersey)
American Ashkenazi Jews
Van Patten family
Military personnel from New York City
20th-century American Jews